Yseult Gervy (born 20 January 1979) is a retired Belgian swimmer who won the bronze medal in the 400 m medley at the 2000 European Aquatics Championships. She also competed in the 1996 and 2000 Summer Olympics in the 100 m and 200 m backstroke, 200 m and 400 m medley, and  freestyle relay events. Her best Olympic achievement was 12th place in the relay.

Gervy had serious health problems in the early 2001 that forced her to retire in 2002. Before the retirement she was trained by her brother at the club Cercle de Natation Bruxelles Atalante. Between 1994 and 2000 she won 20 national titles and set 17 national records.

References

External links
 

1979 births
Living people
Belgian female freestyle swimmers
Olympic swimmers of Belgium
Swimmers at the 1996 Summer Olympics
Swimmers at the 2000 Summer Olympics
European Aquatics Championships medalists in swimming
People from Nivelles
Belgian female backstroke swimmers
Belgian female medley swimmers
Sportspeople from Walloon Brabant
20th-century Belgian women
21st-century Belgian women